Granger Station State Historic Site, also known as Granger Stage Station, South Bend Station and Ham's Fork Station, is a state park in Granger, Wyoming, United States, that is listed on the National Register of Historic Places (NRHP).

Description
The site is dedicated to the interpretation of the station, the Pony Express and the Overland Trail. There are two interior rooms.

History
A settlement was first established about 1856 at the meeting of Hams Fork with Blacks Fork of the Green River, where a ferry crossed Hams Fork. This became a station on the Pony Express in 1860-1861, then was a station on the Overland Trail in 1862. By this time it was known as the South Bend Station. In 1868 the trail was superseded when the Union Pacific Railroad arrived at the site. The station was deeded to the State of Wyoming in 1930. It is operated as a state historic site.  The Granger Station was placed on the National Register of Historic Places on February 26, 1970.

The site was added to the NRHP February 26, 1970.

See also

 List of Wyoming state parks
 National Register of Historic Places listings in Sweetwater County, Wyoming

References

External links

 
 Granger Stage Station at the Wyoming State Historic Preservation Office
 Granger Stage Station, Old Route 30 North, Granger, Sweetwater, WY at the Historic American Buildings Survey (HABS)

Buildings and structures completed in 1856
Buildings and structures in Sweetwater County, Wyoming
Historic American Buildings Survey in Wyoming
Wyoming state historic sites
Pre-statehood history of Wyoming
1856 establishments in Utah Territory
National Register of Historic Places in Sweetwater County, Wyoming
Stagecoach stations in Wyoming
Stagecoach stations on the National Register of Historic Places in Wyoming
Overland Trail
IUCN Category III